Katzenworld is the UK's biggest blog platform on the subject of the cat. Katzenworld was founded by German-born Marc-André Runcie-Unger, Yuki Chung and Laura Haile. The name came from the German word Katzen meaning cats so it translates in English as Cats World. It was launched March 2014. It receives an average rate of 210.000 visits per month in 2019, Cision Media Intelligience.

Brand design
The brand's logo represents a Tuxedo Cat as its main focus. Promotional materials for the website and merchandise were then categorised into different colours.

Editors

Lead writer Marc has won awards from the cat writer association, receiving a certificate of excellence for being included in the Top 3 Cat Health Articles of 2016. Ranked as part of the Top 15 Cat Influencers on the Web compiled by Allaboutcats.

Contributors
Katzenworld has regular article contributions from animal welfare experts such as Royal Society for the Prevention of Cruelty to Animals | Rspca, UK cat behaviourist and author Anita Kelsey, UK charity Cats Protection and feline welfare charity International Cat Care.

Products and collaborations 
Katzenworld's news stories and the publication's online shop products generally target cat lovers & owners. First introduced through online competitions, Katzenworld launched its first collection of keyrings and personalised cat designs of the winners.

Following the exclusive appearance of 4cats toys in the Katzenworld online store, the products were then sold at pet shows such as the UK National Pet Show nationwide.
 
 Which helped the official UK launch of 4cats products in the UK and 4cats X Katzenworld collaborations.

Awards and nominations

References

External links
 

Animal websites
British blogs